Dimorphandra is a genus of legume in the family Fabaceae, subfamily Caesalpinioideae.

Accepted Species
Dimorphandra comprises the following subgenera and species:
 Subgenus Dimorphandra Tul. 1844

 Dimorphandra caudata Ducke 1925
 Dimorphandra exaltata† Schott 1827
 Dimorphandra gardneriana Tulasne 1844
 Dimorphandra jorgei M. Freitas da Silva 1981
 Dimorphandra loretensis M. Freitas da Silva 1981
 Dimorphandra mediocris Ducke 1938
 Dimorphandra mollis Benth. 1840
 Dimorphandra multiflora Ducke 1922
 Dimorphandra parviflora Spruce ex Benth 1870
 Dimorphandra pullei Amshoff 1939
 Dimorphandra wilsonii Rizzini 1969
 Subgenus Phaneropsia Arch. 1844
 Dimorphandra conjugata† (Splitg.) Sandwith 1932
 Dimorphandra davisii Sprague & Sandwith 1932
 Dimorphandra disimillis Cowan 1961

 Dimorphandra unijuga Tulasne 1844
 Dimorphandra williamii M. F. da Silva, 1981
 Subgenus Pocillum Tul. 1844
 Dimorphandra campinarum Ducke 1925
 Dimorphandra coccinea Ducke 1953

 Dimorphandra cuprea Sprague & Sandwith 1932
 subsp. cuprea Sprague & Sandwith 1932
 subsp. ferruginea (Ducke) M. F. da Silva 1986
 subsp. velutina (Ducke) M.F. da Silva 1986

 Dimorphandra gigantea Ducke 1935

 Dimorphandra ignea Ducke 1935
 Dimorphandra macrostachya Benth. 1840
 subsp. congestiflora (Ducke) M. F. Silva 1986
 subsp. glabrifolia (Ducke) M. F. Silva 1986
 subsp. macrostachya Benth. 1840
 Dimorphandra pennigera Tulasne 1844
 Dimorphandra polyandra R. Benois 1917
 Dimorphandra urubuensis Ducke 1944

 Dimorphandra vernicosa† Spruce ex Benth. 1867
†Indicates the type species of the subgenus.

Species names with uncertain taxonomic status 
The status of the following species is unresolved:

 Dimorphandra foldatsii Cowan 1961

 Dimorphandra speciosa  Spruce ex Benth. 1870

References

Fabaceae genera
Caesalpinioideae
Taxonomy articles created by Polbot